Herrenhausen-Stöcken (Eastphalian: Herrnhusen) is a borough of the German city of Hanover, northwest of the city centre. In 2020 it had a population of 37,543. It consists of the quarters Burg, Herrenhausen, Ledeburg, Leinhausen, Marienwerder and Stöcken.

Industries include Johnson Controls (spun off from VARTA) and Herrenhäuser Brewery founded in 1868. Places of worship include the Herrenhäuser Kirche.

Palace and Gardens

A major attraction is the baroque Herrenhausen Palace and Herrenhausen Gardens, established by the House of Hanover.

The palace was largely destroyed in World War II and not rebuilt until 2013.

The 19th-century "Welfenmausoleum" in the Gardens is the burial place of Ernest Augustus, King of Hanover, and after World War II the remains of King George I of Great Britain along with his parents' were removed from the crypt of Leineschloss and reinterred there.

See also
 House of Welf (Guelph)

References

Boroughs and quarters of Hanover